Michele Giordano (26 September 1930 – 2 December 2010) was an Italian Roman Catholic prelate, who was the Archbishop of Naples and a cardinal-priest.

Biography 
Giordano was born at Sant'Arcangelo, in Basilicata. He was educated at the Minor Seminary in Potenza and later at the Pontifical Regional Seminary, Salerno and finally at the Pontifical Inter-regional Seminary, Posillipo. He was ordained to the priesthood on 5 July 1953. He served from 1953 to 1971 successively in the diocese of Anglona-Tursi as pastor; director of the center for social studies; diocesan assistant of the Catholic Action; professor of religion; vicar general. He was created Chaplain of His Holiness on 23 February 1968.

In 1971 Pope Paul VI named him as the titular bishop of Lari Castello and the Auxiliary Bishop of Matera, and, in 1974, as the Archbishop of Matera; it was eventually renamed as the Roman Catholic Archdiocese of Matera-Irsina. He obtained the title of Metropolitan Archbishop of the Roman Catholic Archdiocese of Naples in 1987. The following year Pope John Paul II created him Cardinal-Priest of San Gioacchino ai Prati di Castello. He retired in May 2006, and was succeeded by Cardinal Crescenzio Sepe.

Cardinal Giordano was admitted to the Monaldi Hospital in Naples with respiratory problems and died a week later on 2 December 2010, at age 80. In the papal telegram of condolence sent on 3 December 2010 to Cardinal Sepe, Pope Benedict XVI offered prayers for the repose of his soul and the Apostolic Blessing to all those in mourning, stating that he learned of the prelate's death "with great sadness."

References 

1930 births
2010 deaths
People from the Province of Potenza
20th-century Italian cardinals
Archbishops of Naples
Cardinals created by Pope John Paul II
20th-century Italian Roman Catholic archbishops